The Buckley School is a college preparatory day school for students in grades kindergarten through 12. Founded in 1933 by Isabelle Buckley, the school is located in Sherman Oaks in the San Fernando Valley portion of Los Angeles, California, in the United States. Buckley is one of the oldest co-educational day schools in the Los Angeles area.

Description
The Buckley School is a K–12 school that enrolls a total of 830 students. Approximate division sizes are 270 in grade K–5; 210 in grades 6–8; and 345 in grades 9–12, allowing for an average class size of 17 students. The school's Middle and Upper divisions follow a six-day block schedule, with 70-minute class intervals. The school's Lower division follows a five-day schedule and combines a developmental approach with structure. All divisions are located on a single 18-acre campus in Sherman Oaks, California. Buckley is accredited by the California Association of Independent Schools, the Western Association of Schools and Colleges, and the California Department of Education. It is also a member of the National Association of Independent Schools.

History
The Buckley School was founded as an "independent co-educational institution" by Isabelle Buckley in 1933 based on her own "4-Fold Plan of Education", which equally emphasizes academics, arts, athletics, and an ethical education. Early campuses were located on Doheny Drive in Los Angeles, on Hayvenhurst Avenue in Van Nuys, and the school had two locations in Sherman Oaks, on Riverside Drive and Woodman Avenue. In 1964, Isabelle Buckley purchased land from the Glenaire Country Club in Sherman Oaks, and by 1973 all five divisions of the school were consolidated at the Stansbury Avenue location. In 2008, the city of Los Angeles approved campus enhancements to be completed over a six-year (non-consecutive) total building period. Construction began in 2011; Phase III of Buckley's Campus Enhancement Plan began in late 2014 and was scheduled to end in late 2016.

By the end of 2016, the school added three new buildings to support academics, including specialized science, technology, engineering, and math (STEM) classrooms, as well as the performing arts, including dance and music rehearsal spaces, a black-box theatre, and a performance and community gathering space. Improvements also have included a renovated Middle and Upper School library and administrative offices, renovated classrooms and Lower School administrative offices.

In December 2017, Julie Taylor-Vaz, a Buckley School guidance counselor, learned that a Buckley student identified as “Eliza” Bass – a pseudonym given by Vanity Fair – had been accepted to Tulane University, Georgetown and Loyola Marymount as an “African-American tennis whiz, ranked in the Top 10 in California,” according to the report. The only problem was that the student was actually white and did not play tennis. Taylor-Vaz alerted her superiors and notified all three schools, Vanity Fair reports. All three denied the elicit applications and Eliza was allowed to pull her applications and reapply.

According to Vanity Fair, Eliza’s father, Adam Bass [Adam J. Bass], a member of the Buckley School Board, initially denied that he had used an outside admissions consultant before finally admitting to Buckley that his family had hired Rick Singer, the Newport Beach man who became infamous in March for spearheading the admissions scandal which netted the arrests of at least 50 parents, college coaches and testing administrators, including actresses Lori Loughlin, Felicity Huffman.

Board of Trustees 
The Buckley Board of Trustees is composed of current parents, alumni, parents of alumni, and friends of the school who go through a rigorous vetting and training process facilitated by the committee on trustees. The composition of the board changes every year, as terms expire and new trustees are elected. Trustees can serve up to three, three-year terms and participate in at least two board committees each year of their trusteeship. Buckley's trustees emeriti include Maurice Marciano, Philip de Toledo, and Terry Semel.

Campus 
Buckley's Lower, Middle, and Upper divisions share a single 18-acre (7.3 ha) campus. According to the school's website, facilities include more than 60 classrooms, two libraries, an indoor gymnasium and theatre, a 4-acre (1.6 ha) outdoor field and stadium, an indoor pool, a weight-training facility, an outdoor basketball court, two Lower School play yards, a nature trail, and a garden and outdoor classroom/patio. Buckley is one of the oldest co-educational day schools in Los Angeles, and one of the few with all K–12 students on one campus. The school's Academic and Performing Arts Building opened in 2012, followed by its Mathematics and Science Building in 2013. These buildings feature modern music, theater, dance, and art classrooms, as well as a new theatre, journalism classroom, student technology center, digital arts and music center, and science classrooms with prep areas for labs. Buckley's Center for Community and the Arts was expected to be completed in 2016.

Culture
The school's motto is "Dare to Be True". The "Buckley Commitment", which is displayed in all classrooms and is signed by students and teachers at the start of each academic year, sets expectations for respect, kindness, honesty, loyalty, self-discipline and self-reliance. The school's dress code dates back to its founding and has been modernized in the intervening years. Today, boys wear a combination of polo shirts, khakis pants or shorts, sweaters in the school's colors (red, black, or gray) and Buckley sweatshirts; girls wear skirts, black jeans, sweaters in school colors, polo shirts, or Buckley sweatshirts. Buckley's mascot is the griffin.

Buckley offers student activities, as well as after-school and summer programs. Interscholastic sports include baseball for male students and softball and volleyball for female students; co-ed sports include basketball, cross-country running, equestrian sports, soccer, swimming and diving, and tennis. The school maintains a no-cut policy in Middle School athletics.

The school's newspaper is The Student Voice. In 1998, Los Angeles Times presented the school with a "general excellence award" as part of its annual High School Journalism Awards competition, earning Buckley $1,000 for its journalism program. In 2010 and 2012, The Student Voice received "High School Newspaper Silver Crown" awards from the Columbia Scholastic Press Association (CSPA). In 2015, individual contributors were recognized in the categories "Sidebar writing", "Sports Page Design", and "Single Subject News or Feature Package, Double-truck or Special Section Design" at the CSPA's 32nd Gold Circle Awards.

In 2002, the Performing Arts Department collaborated with writer and director Stuart Ross to present the world premiere of The Sounds of Plaid, a large-cast, co-ed version of Ross's Forever Plaid. In 2015, 34 students won 60 Scholastic Art Awards, which have been presented to student artists in grades 7–12 nationwide since 1923. Students earned awards in thirteen categories: architecture, ceramics and glass, comic art, design, digital art, drawing and illustration, fashion, film and animation, jewelry, mixed media, painting, photography, printmaking, sculpture, and art portfolio.

In the wake of the social unrest of 2020 and the emergence of similar social media accounts across the country, an Instagram account called "blackatbuckley" was created to document and compile the historical instances of racism on campus.

Notable alumni
 Paris Hilton, media personality and socialite
 Tatyana Ali, actress and singer
 Paul Thomas Anderson, filmmaker
 Christian Brando, actor
 Tevin Campbell, singer
 Natalie Cole, singer, songwriter and actress
 Laura Dern, actress
 Abigail Disney, producer and heiress
 Bret Easton Ellis, author, screenwriter and director
 Melissa Gilbert, actress and director
 Sara Gilbert, actress
Albert Hammond Jr., musician and music producer
 Gaby Hoffmann, actress
Paris Jackson, model and musician
 Rashida Jones, actress
Kim Kardashian, media personality
Rob Kardashian, television personality and businessman
 Michael Landon Jr., actor and filmmaker
 Meredith MacRae, actress and singer
 Alyssa Milano, actress
 Tracy Nelson, actress 
 David Niven, Jr., actor
 Matthew Perry, actor, comedian and producer
 Nicole Richie, actress and fashion designer
 Nicollette Sheridan, actress

References

External links
 

1933 establishments in California
Educational institutions established in 1933
High schools in the San Fernando Valley
Preparatory schools in California
Private K-12 schools in Los Angeles County, California
Sherman Oaks, Los Angeles
High schools in Los Angeles
Schools in Los Angeles